The American in Me is a compilation album by the Avengers. It was released on April 20, 2004, on DBK Works. The album is composed of four studio recordings from 1978 and a live concert recorded at the Old Waldorf in San Francisco, CA on June 13, 1979. The concert was previously released on Zero Hour one year earlier.

Track listing
 "We Are the One" – 2:39
 "The American in Me" – 2:07
 "White Nigger" – 3:29
 "Uh-Oh" – 3:07
 "Cheap Tragedies" – 3:30
 "Zero Hour" – 3:23
 "Corpus Christi" – 3:04
 "Release Me" – 4:33
 "Uh-Oh" – 3:23
 "Misery (Finger on the Trigger)" – 3:05
 "Time To Die" – 5:05
 "The American In Me" – 2:10

Personnel
Penelope Houston – vocals
Greg Ingraham – guitar on tracks 1–4
Brad Kent – guitar on tracks 5–12
Danny Furious – drums
Jimmy Wilsey – bass

Avengers (band) albums
DBK Works albums
2004 compilation albums